Jovan Ninković (Serbian Cyrillic: Јован Нинковић; born 25 July 1987) is a Serbian retired footballer.

Career
In August 2007, he moved to Ruch Chorzów on a four-year contract. In March 2010, he was loaned to Polonia Słubice on a half-year deal. In September 2010, he was loaned to KSZO Ostrowiec on a half-year deal. In January 2011, he was loaned to on a half-year deal.

In July 2011, he joined Górnik Łęczna.

Personal life
He obtained Polish citizenship on 19 March 2016.

References

External links
 

1987 births
Living people
Serbian footballers
Serbian expatriate footballers
RFK Novi Sad 1921 players
Ruch Chorzów players
KSZO Ostrowiec Świętokrzyski players
Górnik Łęczna players
Zagłębie Sosnowiec players
Ekstraklasa players
I liga players
II liga players
Expatriate footballers in Poland
Serbian expatriate sportspeople in Poland
Association football defenders
Naturalized citizens of Poland